Polygala is a large genus of flowering plants belonging to the family Polygalaceae. They are commonly known as milkworts or snakeroots. The genus is distributed widely throughout much of the world in temperate zones and the tropics. The genus name Polygala comes from the ancient Greek "much milk", as the plant was thought to increase milk yields in cattle.

Description
As traditionally circumscribed, Polygala includes annual and perennial plants, shrubs, vines, and trees. The roots often have a scent reminiscent of wintergreen. The leaf blades are generally undivided and smooth-edged, and are alternately arranged in most species. The inflorescence is a raceme or spikelike array of several flowers; the occasional species bears solitary flowers. The flower is bilateral in shape, with two large petal-like sepals on the sides, often called the "wings", and three smaller sepals behind. There are three petals in shades of reddish purple, yellow or white, which are joined at the bases. The lower of the three is the keel petal, which is "boat-shaped, cucullate [hood-like], or helmet-shaped". The keel petal may have a beak or a fringe on the tip. Stamens and style are within the curve of the keel petal. The fruit is a capsule, sometimes winged. It contains two seeds, which are usually black, hairy and tipped with a large white aril. No members of this genus are known to form nitrogen-fixing nodules.

Taxonomy
The genus Polygala was first described by Carl Linnaeus in 1754. Phylogenetic studies showed that, as traditionally circumscribed, the genus was not monophyletic. It had become a "wastebasket taxon"; almost all species with a flower apparently similar to those of the Papilionoideae – two petaloid lateral sepals forming 'wings', two petals forming a 'standard', and one petal forming a 'keel', plus a bilocular fruit capsule – were placed in Polygala, while species with more obviously specialized features, particularly those of the fruit, were placed in other genera. In 2011, John Richard Abbott separated some more sharply defined genera from Polygala.

Species

Partly because of differing circumscriptions, the reported number of valid species in the genus varies from about 350 to 500 to 725 or 730. The Americas have the most species, especially South America, with Africa second in diversity and Asia third.
, Plants of the World Online accepted about 660 species in the genus Polygala. These include:

Species now placed in other genera:
Polygala acanthoclada = Rhinotropis acanthoclada
Polygala californica = Rhinotropis californica
Polygala chamaebuxus = Polygaloides chamaebuxus
Polygala paucifolia = Polygaloides paucifolia
Polygala cornuta = Rhinotropis cornuta
Polygala heterorhyncha = Rhinotropis heterorhyncha
Polygala intermontana = Rhinotropis intermontana
Polygala macradenia = Hebecarpa macradenia
Polygala pterolopha = Monrosia pterolopha
Polygala rectipilis = Hebecarpa rectipilis
Polygala subspinosa = Rhinotropis subspinosa

Hybrid
Polygala × dalmaisiana (of garden origin)

Ecology
Polygala species are used as food plants by the larvae of some Lepidoptera species including large grizzled skipper.

Cultivation
Some species are valued in cultivation. An evergreen shrub has gained the Royal Horticultural Society's Award of Garden Merit under the name P. × dalmaisiana.

References

 
Fabales genera